Sovetsky District is an administrative and municipal district (raion), one of the nine in Khanty-Mansi Autonomous Okrug of Tyumen Oblast, Russia. It is located in the southwest of the autonomous okrug. Its administrative center is the town of Sovetsky. Population: 48,059 (2010 Census);  The population of the administrative center accounts for 55.1% of the district's total population.

References

Notes

Sources

Districts of Khanty-Mansi Autonomous Okrug